Ahmad Huseinzadeh also known as Sheikh Ahmad Salyani — third Sheikh ul-Islam of the Caucasus, maternal grandfather of Ali bey Huseynzade.

Early life
He was born in Salyan in 1812 to Ali Huseynzadeh. He was brought up initially from 1822 to 1832 in his hometown by his uncle Akhund Molla Muhammad Hussein. Then he became a student of the Baku mujtahid Akhund Molla Ramazan, and studied with him for another six years, until 1838 when he completed the full course of Arabic sciences.

Career
After graduation he returned to Salyan in 1839 and started teaching various subjects to local children for 6 years. He was later gained higher religious education in Najaf and Tbilisi. He was appointed as Sheikh ul-Islam by Alexander II of Russia after Fazil Iravani's resignation with a monthly pension of 1600 rubles on 15 October 1852. He was appointed as head of Spiritual Council of Transcaucasian Shia Muslims, 5 April 1875. His deputy was Akhund Mustafa Talibzadeh, father of Abdulla Shaig. He was described as a rather liberal thinking cleric by Fatali Akhundzadeh and contributed to Akinchi, first Azerbaijani language newspaper. In his letter to Akhundzadeh in 1862, Yousuf Khan Mostashar al-Dowleh said of Huseinzadeh "I don't even consider him a mullah, but rather a spiritual cleric." Like Akhundzadeh, he was a promoter of Latin alphabet for Azerbaijani, defended the idea that it is not incompatible with Sharia and Islam.

He resigned in 1884 and lived in Tbilisi where he died 3 years later.

Family 
He was married to the daughter of his uncle Mahammad Ali Huseynzadeh, Husniyya Khanum and had two daughters with her:

 Fatima Huseinzadeh (b. April 1, 1844, d. 1890) — married to Hajji Muhammad agha, son of Hajji Mirza Hasan in Shamakhi
 Khadija Huseinzadeh — married to Molla Hussein Huseinzadeh, son of Kazim bey Huseinzadeh of Quruzma
 Ali bey Huseynzade
 Ismail Huseynzade (1868-1941) — married to his cousin Mina (b. 1878), daughter of Fatima Huseinzadeh, had issues

Works
 Muallim-ul atghal fi tarighe-talimi atfal (1875, Tbilisi)
 Basaul nas-fi-mamlakatul Kafkas (Nations of the country of Caucasus, uncompleted work)
 Tarikhi-adabiyyati-Turk (History of Turkic literature)
 Tarbiat-ul-atfal
 Dilgushah

Awards 

 Order of St. Anna, 2nd class with Imperial crown (22 September 1871)
 Order of St. Vladimir, 3rd class (30 August 1881)

References

Azerbaijani Shia clerics
1812 births
1887 deaths
Recipients of the Order of St. Anna, 2nd class
Recipients of the Order of St. Vladimir, 3rd class